Henrik Ölander (born 29 October 1997) is a Finnish professional footballer who plays for Gnistan, as a left back.

Career
Ölander's senior career began when he was promoted to HJK's second team, Klubi 04. During the 2015–2017 seasons, Ölander played a total of 49 matches in Kakkonen, but was unable to play for HJK's first team.

Ölander then moved to Veikkausliiga club, PS Kemi, for the 2018 season. Ölander made his debut in the Veikkausliiga on May 3, 2018 against VPS. He played a total of 12 league matches in the 2018 season. PS Kemi was relegated to Ykkönen at the end of the season and later went bankrupt. He then moved to RoPS, who played in the Veikkausliiga for the 2019 season. Ölander played a total of 14 league matches in the 2019 season.

Ölander moved to Ykkönen club AC Oulu for the 2020 season.

On 29 December 2021, he signed with Gnistan for the 2022 season.

References

External links

1997 births
Living people
Finnish footballers
Klubi 04 players
Helsingin Jalkapalloklubi players
Kemi City F.C. players
Rovaniemen Palloseura players
AC Oulu players
IF Gnistan players
Veikkausliiga players
Kakkonen players
Association football fullbacks